12 Stones is the debut album from the American rock band 12 Stones. It was released on April 23, 2002 by Wind-up Records. The album debuted on the Billboard 200 at No. 147.

Track listing

Personnel
12 Stones
 Paul McCoy – lead vocals
 Eric Weaver – guitar
 Kevin Dorr – bass guitar
 Aaron Gainer – drums, percussion

Production
 Jay Baumgardner – producer, audio mixing
 Dave Fortman – co-producer
 James Murray – audio engineering
 Ted Jensen – audio mastering at Precision Mastering, Hollywood, CA 
 Dan Certa – assistant engineering
 Jeremy Parker – assistant engineering
 John Katsoudas – assistant engineering

Charts

References

12 Stones albums
2002 debut albums
Albums produced by Dave Fortman
Wind-up Records albums